The Adelaide Film Festival Investment Fund was established in 2003 by the South Australian Premier, Mike Rann, to boost the local production of films.

When the American festival director Peter Sellars was director of the 2002 Adelaide Festival of Arts, he commissioned five films. Four of those films won awards, including The Tracker, Beneath Clouds and Walking on Water. That success prompted the State Government to provide the Adelaide Film Festival (AFF) with a production investment fund, which the AFF administers. Up to $1,000,000 is made available over a two-year period. The Adelaide Film Festival Board selects projects, based on recommendations from the Festival Director, and the slate of pictures produced premieres at the event.

To date, the Investment Fund has invested in seventy-two projects, including features, documentaries, short films and new media projects. These projects have won 70 international and 130 national awards. Adelaide remains one of the few festivals worldwide with an investment fund.

Purpose
The Adelaide Film Festival aims to support the projects of strong creative teams. It uses creative criteria such as bold and innovative storytelling, and also requires projects to contribute culturally and economically to South Australia. These projects will bring development opportunities, branding opportunities, or partnerships with national and international organisations. They should have potential to raise the profile of South Australia.

Museum of Modern Art (MoMA)
In 2011, the Museum of Modern Art in New York City hosted a week-long festival of Adelaide Film Festival Investment Fund films (from 7 to 13 April 2011). The MoMA week was a salute to the Adelaide Film Festival and the Adelaide Film Festival Investment Fund, "a testament to its vision and success in realising some of the most unique, creative, interesting, challenging and entertaining Australian films of the recent past."

The program included Look Both Ways, Ten Canoes, Samson and Delilah, Stunt Love, Boxing Day, Last Ride, My Year Without Sex and Mrs. Carey’s Concert.

Hive Production FUND + LAB
In 2011, the Australian Broadcasting Corporation TV Arts & Entertainment and the Adelaide Film Festival joined forces to create the Hive Production Fund. The inaugural FUND supported the projects The Boy Castaways by Michael Kantor, I Want to Dance Better at Parties by Matthew Bate, and Tender by Lynette Wallworth.

The LAB is run in partnership between the Australia Council for the Arts, Screen Australia, ABC Arts and South Australian Film Corporation. A unique workshop environment, it fosters new opportunities for artists working in theatre, art, dance and other non-cinematic fields to collaborate with traditional screen practitioners. The LAB encourages art form cross-pollination – between practitioners, and between processes and creative approaches. The third and final LAB will run during the 2015 Adelaide Film Festival.

Sundance Institute
Adelaide Film Festival Investment Fund collaborates with Sundance Institute’s New Frontier program to identify potential opportunities for Australian artists and filmmakers to present new media work at future editions of the Sundance Film Festival.

New Frontier at Sundance Institute is a dynamic initiative intended to identify and foster independent artists working at the convergence of film, art, media, live performance, music and technology.

Since 2007, the New Frontier exhibition at the Sundance Film Festival has provided the highest level of curation in the emerging field, incorporating fiction, non-fiction and hybrid projects to showcase transmedia storytelling, multi-media installations, performances and films. It has a long presentation association of Australian work, including Lynette Wallworth’s Evolution of Fearlessness and Coral: Rekindling Venus; Matthew Bate’s Shut Up Little Man!; and Closer Productions’ My 52 Tuesdays project.

Past projects

References

External links
 Official Website

 List